Cyanothamnus warangensis is a species of erect, woody shrub that is endemic to Queensland. It has bipinnate leaves and groups of between five and twenty-five or more white flowers in leaf axils.

Description
The stamens are hairy on their edges and the stigma is minute, scarcely wider than the style.

Taxonomy and naming
This species was first formally described in 2003 by Marco F. Duretto who gave it the name Boronia warangensis in the journal Muelleriafrom a specimen collected in the Warang section of the White Mountains National Park. In a 2013 paper in the journal Taxon, Marco Duretto and others changed the name to Cyanothamnus warangensis on the basis of cladistic analysis. The specific epithet (warangensis) refers to type location.

Distribution and habitat
Cyanothamnus warangensis is confined to the White Mountains National Park where it grows in scrub or woodland in sandstone country.

Conservation
Cyanothamnus warangensis (as Boronia warangensis) is listed as of "least concern" by the Queensland Government Department of Environment and Science.

References 

warangensis
Flora of Queensland
Plants described in 2003
Taxa named by Marco Duretto